Lukov may refer to:

Surname
Lukov (surname)

Places
Czech Republic
Lukov (Teplice District), a municipality and village in the Ústí nad Labem Region
Lukov (Třebíč District), a municipality and village in the Vysočina Region
Lukov (Zlín District), a municipality and village in the Zlín Region
Lukov Castle
Lukov (Znojmo District), a market town in the South Moravian Region

Slovakia
Lukov (Bardejov District), a municipality and village in the Prešov Region